Hit Lady is a 1974 made-for-TV film that aired on October 8, 1974. Starring Yvette Mimieux as artist and assassin Angela de Vries, it was written by Mimieux and directed by Tracy Keenan Wynn.

Plot
An artist works part-time as a syndicate assassin. She decides to do one last job, killing a labor leader Jeffrey Baine. However she can't go through with the job.

Cast

Yvette Mimieux as Angela de Vries
Joseph Campanella as Jeffrey Baine
Clu Gulager as Roarke
Dack Rambo as Doug Reynolds
Keenan Wynn as Buddy McCormack
Roy Jenson as Eddie
Paul George as Webb
Del Monroe as Hansen

Production
Hit Lady was written by Mimieux, and directed by Tracy Keenan Wynn.

Development
By the early 1970s Mimieux was well established as an actor but was unhappy with the roles offered to female actors. "The women they [male screenwriters] write are all one dimensional," she said. "They have no complexity in their lives. It's all surface. There's nothing to play. They're either sex objects or vanilla pudding."

Mimieux had been writing for several years prior to this film, mostly journalism and short stories. She had the idea for a story about a Pirandello-like theme, "the study of a woman, the difference between what she appears to be and what she is: appearance vs reality." Mimieux says the more she thought about the character "the more I wanted to play her. Here was the kind of nifty, multifaceted part I'd been looking for. So instead of a short story, I wrote it as a film."

She wrote a thriller called Counterpoint about a female killer who used her attractive appearance to get close to her victims. She said the character was "not... a good housewife or sex object. The character I wrote is like an onion, layers upon layers, multi-facted, interesting, desirable, manipulative... It's about what people are saying to each other and what they mean."

Mimieux had appeared in two TV movies, Black Noon and Death Takes a Holiday, so took her script to producers Aaron Spelling and Leonard Goldberg who submitted it to ABC as a TV movie. The network wanted some changes. "I created a totally amoral creature who killed people like you'd swat a fly, with no remorse, no regret," said Mimieux. "That was a little too strong for the network. So they made me soften her." They also insisted the script be retitled from Counterpoint to Hit Lady.

Tracy Keenan Wynn was the son of Keenan Wynn and grandson of Ed Wynn. He had developed a strong reputation as a screenwriter, his credits including The Longest Yard, The Glass House and The Autobiography of Miss Jane Pittman. This allowed him to make his directorial debut with this film. His father Keenan made a cameo appearance as he wanted to be the first actor ever directed by his son. (It would be the only film he ever directed.)

Broadcast and reception
Hit Lady first aired on ABC on October 8, 1974 as part of its ABC Movie of the Week anthology series. It was one of the highest-rated and most talked about TV movies of 1974.

The Los Angeles Times called it a "tightly structured, richly textured melodrama".

The movie was repeated in June 1975.

References

External links

1974 television films
1974 films
American television films